The 1885–86 season was the fourth season in which Bolton Wanderers competed in a senior competitive football competition. The club entered the FA Cup in October 1885, but were knocked out in the third round by Preston North End and subsequently disqualified for professionalism.

F.A. Cup

See also
Bolton Wanderers F.C. seasons

References

Bolton Wanderers F.C. seasons
Bolton Wanderers F.C.